American Porn Songs is the sixth studio album by 16volt, released on September 8, 2009 by Metropolis Records.

Reception

David Jeffries of AllMusic awarded American Porn Songs three and a half out of five stars, called it the most cohesive album Eric Powell had composed and said "everything on the album sounds genuinely inspired, coming straight from Powell's ever-blackening heart as if it just needed to get out." Brutal Resonance commended the production quality and composition variety, saying "there are some tracks on this album that vary but most of the tracks follow the same line and it's a pretty straight forward album." Soundsphere Magazine gave the album four out of five stars, praised the music's energetic blend of electro and metal music and called it "a hard-hitting attack on the porn industry and its effect on those who take part."

Track listing

Personnel
Adapted from the American Porn Songs liner notes.

16volt
 Jason Bazinet – drums
 Mike Peoples – bass guitar, guitars
 Eric Powell – lead vocals, guitars, programming, keyboards, production, recording, mixing, cover art
 Steve White (as Steve Pig) – guitars

Additional performers
 Joseph Bishara - programming
 John "Servo" DeSalvo – drums
 Sean Payne – programming
 Scott Robison – guitars, programming
 Bill Sarver (as Billdeaux) – guitars, programming
 Tim Sköld – guitars, programming

Production and design
 Ryan Foster – mastering

Release history

References

External links 
 
 American Porn Songs at Bandcamp
 

2009 albums
16volt albums
Metropolis Records albums